Abbeystrewry  is a parish, formerly within the Diocese of Ross.

References

Civil parishes of County Cork